New York City Tenement House Commissioner

 William Francis Deegan
 Thomas Crowell Taylor Crain 1904 to 1905.

References

Commissioners in New York City